The Eryaman Stadium is a stadium in the Eryaman neighbourhood of Etimesgut, Ankara, Turkey. The construction began in 2016 and was completed in 2019. Gençlerbirliği and Ankaragücü use the stadium for home games.

References

Football venues in Turkey
Sports venues in Ankara
Sports venues completed in 2019
Osmanlıspor
Buildings and structures in Turkey
2019 establishments in Turkey